Pedro de Silva Cienfuegos-Jovellanos (born 18 August 1945 Gijón, Spain) is a Spanish politician, lawyer and writer. He served as the second President of the Principality of Asturias from 17 June 1983, until 10 July 1991.

Pedro de Silva was born 18 August 1945 Gijón, Asturias, Spain. His father, Pedro de Silva Sierra, a lawyer as well, served as the dean of the Escuela de Práctica Jurídica in Gijón from 1975 until 1990. His mother, María Jesús Cienfuegos-Jovellanos Vigil-Escalera, died on 9 August 2004, at the age of 85. De Silva is a direct descendant of Gaspar Melchor de Jovellanos through his mother's lineage.

References

1945 births
Presidents of the Principality of Asturias
Members of the Congress of Deputies (Spain)
Spanish male writers
People from Gijón
People from Asturias
Living people
Colegio de la Inmaculada (Gijón) alumni